Ritwik Bhowmik is an Indian actor known for portraying Radhe in Bandish Bandits and Sanket Bhadoria in The Whistleblower.

Career 
Bhowmik started his acting career at age 9, appearing in live stage shows and plays. He worked in 17 plays like Charlie And The Tin Can and also made appearances in 6 short films like Sleep, That’s How It Started, and Gamble of Flesh. Later, he became a part of the Bridging Gaps Entertainment production house. In 2017, he made his acting debut on the digital platform with the TVF web series Office VS Office.

In 2019, he made his film debut in the lead role with Bengali drama film, Dhuusar as Shiladitya Guha. He worked in a Netflix show titled Gabru and also appeared in several videos of FilterCopy Talkies. In 2020, he made his appearance in a music-based web series Bandish Bandits that premiered on Amazon Prime where he played the lead role of a trained classical singer Radhe Rathore opposite Shreya Chaudhary. In 2022, he featured in an Amazon Prime Video anthology series Modern Love Mumbai opposite Masaba Gupta, and later in the same year in Amazon Prime Video's Maja Ma opposite Barkha Singh.

Filmography

Films

Web series

Music videos

Awards and nominations

References

External links

 

1992 births
Living people
Indian male television actors
21st-century Indian male actors